Just Kiddin are a British electronic music production duo composed of Lewis Thompson and Laurie Revell. The duo is from Kettering, Northamptonshire, England, and formed in 2010. Just Kiddin have remixed the likes of Usher, Parachute Youth, and Theophilus London, and have released original material on labels such as HK, Top Billin, La Valigetta, Sweat It Out, and Nurvous. Just Kiddin have received BBC Radio 1 support from Annie Mac, Nick Grimshaw, B.Traits and Rob Da Bank.

Discography

Extended plays

Singles

Remixes

References 

Musical groups established in 2010
Musical groups from Northamptonshire
English electronic music duos
FFRR Records artists
British record production teams
Record production duos
2010 establishments in England